The men's 400 metres event at the 1969 European Indoor Games was held on 9 March in Belgrade.

Medalists

Results

Heats
The winner of each heat (Q) and the next 1 fastest (q) qualified for the final.

Final

References

400 metres at the European Athletics Indoor Championships
400